The following lists events that happened during 1969 in Rwanda.

Incumbents 
 President: Grégoire Kayibanda

Events

September
 September 29 - Rwandan general election, 1969

References

 
Years of the 20th century in Rwanda
1960s in Rwanda
Rwanda
Rwanda